SK Futures Park is a baseball stadium in Incheon, South Korea. The stadium was completed in 2015 and is used by the KBO Futures League team SK Wyverns. The original training stadium of the SK Wyverns was located in the Nam District of Incheon and was named SK Dream Park. It was built in 2001 and demolished in 2006.

References

Baseball venues in South Korea
Sports venues in Gyeonggi Province
Futures Park
Sports venues completed in 2015
2015 establishments in South Korea